Giresun University is a public university in Giresun, Turkey, founded in 2006.

Affiliations
The university is a member of the Caucasus University Association.

See also
 List of universities in Turkey

References

External links
 Giresun University official website

Universities and colleges in Turkey
Giresun
Educational institutions established in 2006
State universities and colleges in Turkey
Giresun Province
2006 establishments in Turkey